The London Borough of Southwark in South London forms part of Inner London and is connected by bridges across the River Thames to the City of London and London Borough of Tower Hamlets. It was created in 1965 when three smaller council areas amalgamated under the London Government Act 1963. All districts of the area are within the London postal district. It is governed by Southwark London Borough Council.

The part of the South Bank within the borough is home to London Bridge terminus station and the attractions of The Shard, Tate Modern, Shakespeare's Globe and Borough Market that are the largest of the venues in Southwark to draw domestic and international tourism. Dulwich is home to the Dulwich Picture Gallery and the Imperial War Museum is in Elephant and Castle.

History

Southwark is the oldest part of south London. An urban area to the south of the bridge was first developed in the Roman period, but subsequently abandoned. The name Southwark dates from the establishment of a defensive position in the area by King Alfred in the 9th century. The London Borough of Southwark was formed in 1965 from the former area of the Metropolitan Borough of Southwark, the Metropolitan Borough of Camberwell, and the Metropolitan Borough of Bermondsey.

Toponymy
The name Suthriganaweorc or Suthringa geweorche is recorded for the place in the early 10th-century Anglo-Saxon document known as the Burghal Hidage and means "Surrey folk's fort" or "the defensive work of the men of Surrey". Southwark is recorded in the 1086 Domesday Book as Sudweca. The name means "southern defensive work" and is formed from the Old English sūþ (south) and weorc (work). In Old English, Surrey means “southern district (or the men of the southern district)”, so the change from “southern district work” to the latter “southern work” may be an evolution based on the elision of the single syllable ge element, meaning district.

The strategic context of the defences would have been in relation to London, its bridge and preventing waterborne attackers from travelling further up the Thames.

Geography
The borough borders the City of London and the London Borough of Tower Hamlets to the north (the River Thames forming the boundary), the London Borough of Lambeth to the west and the London Borough of Lewisham to the east. To the south the borough tapers giving a brief border with the London Borough of Bromley.

The northwest part of the borough is part of Central London and is densely developed. To the east, the Rotherhithe peninsula has lower-density modern housing and open space formed around the former docks. The southern part of Southwark includes the Victorian suburbs of Camberwell, Peckham and Nunhead, and the prosperous "village" of Dulwich with some very large houses forms the far south of the borough.

Landmarks
Tower Bridge, the Millennium Bridge, Blackfriars Bridge, Southwark Bridge and London Bridge all connect the City of London to the borough. The Tate Modern art gallery, Shakespeare's Globe Theatre, the Imperial War Museum and Borough Market are also within the borough.

Hills and watercourses

The Norwood Ridge, save for around its broad northern third, forms the borough's boundary.  Along these crests, against the extreme of the borough's southern narrow taper, is the highest point of the borough, Sydenham Hill. This is the fifteenth-highest peak in London.

The main watercourse is the Thames bounding the north of the borough into which the area drains.

The southern  of the borough is the valley catchment of a present sewerage and surface water drainage basin, once a large stream with complex mouths across the north of the borough, the Effra. It is in very large part converted to a combined sewer under a Joseph Bazalgette-engineered reform to enable general urbanisation; all combined and public foul sewers drain far to the east – to the Crossness works.

Similarly reformed, into all three types of drainage (foul, combined, surface), are the Neckinger and Peck catchments of the borough.

Demographics 

At the 2001 census Southwark had a population of 244,866.  Southwark was ethnically 63% white, 16% black African and 8% black Caribbean. By 2018 the population was 317,256, with 53% white, 16% black African and 6% black Caribbean. 31% of householders were owner–occupiers.

The area is the home of many Nigerian (Peckham is largely regarded as the heart of London's Nigerian community), Jamaican, South African, South American, Polish, and French immigrants.

Ethnicity

Religion 
Southwark was per the last census about 50% Christian. It has many notable places of Christian worship and ceremony: Anglican, Roman Catholic and other denominations. These include Charles Spurgeon's Metropolitan Tabernacle, Southwark Cathedral (Church of England), Saint George's Cathedral (Roman Catholic), and Saint Mary's Cathedral (Greek Orthodox). London's Norwegian Church, Finnish Church and the Swedish Seamen's Church are all in Rotherhithe. Saint George the Martyr is the oldest church in London dedicated to England's patron saint. Southwark has the most British-Nigerian churches in the country and the highest concentration of African churches outside the continent.

Places of worship for Sunni Muslims, Hindus, Sikhs and Jews exist.

Per the 2011 Census, 35.6% of the borough's resident respondents identified as non-religious, or chose not to state their faith.

The following table shows the religious identity of residents residing in Southwark according to the 2001, 2011 and the 2021 censuses.

Repurposed places of worship
Ex-St Thomas's Church is the Old Operating Theatre Museum and Herb Garret. The other redundant church in public use is Francis Bedford's in Trinity Church Square, as recording studio Henry Wood Hall.

Literature and theatres 

Southwark has many literary associations. Charles Dickens set several of his novels in the old borough where he lived as a young man. The site of The Tabard inn (featured in Chaucer's Canterbury Tales), the White Hart inn and the George Inn which survives.

The rebuilt Globe Theatre and its exhibition on the Bankside remind us of the area's being the birthplace of classical theatre. There is also the remains of the Rose Theatre. In 2007 the Unicorn Theatre for Children was opened on Tooley Street. The Southwark Playhouse is in Elephant and Castle and the Union Theatre is on Union Street near Southwark station. The Menier Chocolate Factory combines a theatre and exhibition space, whilst the newly opened Bridge Theatre is next to Tower Bridge and City Hall.

Museums and galleries 
The borough hosts the main site of the Imperial War Museum at the south end of Borough High Street.

Peckham Library, designed by Will Alsop won the Stirling Prize for modern architecture. Another architecturally innovative library designed by Piers Gough, Canada Water Library opened in 2011.  

South London Gallery between Camberwell and Peckham is split across two buildings on Peckham Road. The Tate Modern is also based at Bankside. MOCA, London, as curated by the artist Michael Petry, and Flat Time House are both contemporary art galleries on Bellenden Road. Dulwich Picture Gallery also is in Dulwich. Bold Tendencies is an annual exhibition space in a former car park on Rye Lane in Peckham.

Another museum is the Old Operating Theatre.

One former museum include the Cuming Museum and the Livesey Museum for Children was a free children's museum housed in the former Camberwell Public Library No.1, which was given to the people of Southwark by the industrialist Sir George Livesey. The museum was closed by Southwark council in 2008.

Economy

The northern end of the borough opposite the Square Mile includes the More London and London Bridge City developments accommodating the offices of major professional service firms. Notable such businesses include PricewaterhouseCoopers, Norton Rose, Ernst & Young, Lawrence Graham and Actis. The Greater London Authority is based at City Hall.

The press and publishing industry is also well represented in Southwark; the Financial Times has its head office in Southwark Bridge Road, and IPC Magazines in Southwark Street. Campus Living Villages UK also has its head office in the borough.

Some of the old industrial and wharfside heritage remains at the now defunct Surrey Commercial Docks now Surrey Quays, including Greenland Dock and Baltic Quay, where major residential schemes were developed in the 1980s and 1990s. Near Tower Bridge old warehouses have been converted to new mixed uses at Butler's Wharf and Hay's Wharf. Similarly, further west, the Oxo Tower hosts restaurants, shops and housing.

There are major retail concentrations at Surrey Quays, Old Kent Road, Elephant & Castle/Walworth Road and central Peckham.

Southwark is currently home to three Opportunity Areas (areas with capacity for significant economic development) as designated in the Mayor of London's London Plan. These are Elephant and Castle, Canada Water and Old Kent Road.

Educational establishments 

London South Bank University (LSBU) has over 23,000 students and 1,700 staff at its principal Elephant and Castle site. The Chancellor is the entrepreneur newscaster Richard Farleigh.

The University of the Arts London has two of its colleges in the borough – at Elephant and Castle is the London College of Communication and on Peckham Road is the Camberwell College of Arts.

The largest university teaching hospital in Europe King's College London is at the Guy's Hospital site, merging the teaching activities of the Guy's, St Thomas' and King's College Hospitals here. St Thomas' was founded in the mid-12th Century in the borough and parts of it remain at St Thomas Street; Guy's was founded opposite this in 1725. The Salvation Army maintains the William Booth Memorial Training College at Denmark Hill.

Founded in 1945, Mountview Academy of Theatre Arts moved to Peckham in 2018.

Housing 
Southwark has a wide variety of housing, including council housing, such as the post-Blitz Aylesbury Estate and the Heygate Estate to provide homes to low-income residents. The aforementioned estates have been turned over to local housing associations to demolish and redevelop as mixed-tenure developments. Southwark Council and the Greater London Authority have invested tens of millions of pounds in supporting the respective housing associations complete these projects, which in both cases will lead to a large increase in the number of properties on the sites, with an almost equal reduction in the amount of social housing: the Aylesbury Estate originally housed 2,403 properties at social rent while post-development there will be 1,323 for social rent and 1,733 for private sale, meanwhile the Heygate Estate had 1,214 properties before demolition, most of which were leased at social rent, while the final plans for the development will see 2,530 homes of which 500 will be social housing.

Southwark's local residents' returns recorded in 2011 that its rented sector comprised 53.4% of its housing, marginally below the highest in England, which was recorded by Camden, at 53.5%.  In neighbouring Lambeth this figure was 47.3% and in neighbouring Croydon the figure was 29.7%.

Southwark had the greatest proportion of social housing in England, 43.7% (31.2% owned by the council itself with the other social housing in the hands of housing associations), at the time of the 2011 census. Tenant management organisations benefit many apartment blocks.  The council set much housing policy among Housing Association blocks to allocate homes based on need and a rent that residents can afford, based on means testing, via headlease and/or by the Housing List.  In many blocks a mixture of social, shared-ownership and private sector housing exists, particularly in those where the right to buy has been exercised and in newer developments.

Courts and judiciary 

The old Southwark borough hosted many Courts and Prisons of Royal Prerogative, the Marshalsea and King's Bench.  As well as the manorial and borough courts, magistrates met until the 20th century at the Surrey Sessions House which had its own jail for the punitive aspect of its work.  The Inner London Sessions House (or now Crown Court) on Newington Causeway descends from these. The Southwark Coroner's Court in Tennis Street dates back to the charter of 1550. In 1964 Southwark Crown Court was opened at English Grounds near London Bridge. Since 1994 the Crown Court for west London Boroughs, was rehoused from Knightsbridge to Southwark as Blackfriars Crown Court. When the decision was taken to separate the judiciary and legislature, in 2007, by transforming the House of Lords Judicial Committee of Law Lords into the Supreme Court took over the court occupying the Middlesex Guildhall, whose City of Westminster judges transferred to Southwark Crown Court, hence the senior judge holds the honorific title of the Recorder of Westminster.  Southwark's local magistrates sit at two courts in the borough, Tower Bridge and Camberwell Green Magistrates Courts.

The concentration of major courts, which are unlawful to film save for sentencing with judicial permission, enables their media coverage: Southwark has seven jurisdictions, six of which are London's criminal courts and which commonly receive offences committed in public office or in businesses based in Westminster and several other London boroughs.

Civic affairs

Mayor
The Mayor of Southwark for 2009–2010 was Tayo Situ (Peckham Ward), who was elected on 19 May 2010.  He replaced Jeff Hook who served from 2009 to 2010. Tayo Situ died in office on 9 May 2011 from cancer. Under the civic and legal protocol he was given a full civic and ceremonial funeral and no replacement could be elected until then which delayed the Annual Council Assembly.
 Charlie Smith was elected Mayor and Jamille Mohammed was appointed as Deputy Mayor in a civic celebration at Southwark Cathedral on Saturday 13 May 2017, incorporating The Southwark Civic Awards and Annual Meeting of the council.

Cabinet
The council is run by a Leader and Cabinet Cabinet, chaired by council leader Peter John. Following the election in 2010 the Cabinet is Labour, replacing the previous Liberal Democrat and Conservative Party coalition.

Coat of arms
The two supporters on the coat of arms are an Elizabethan player dressed to play Hamlet to the left, indicating the theatrical heritage of the area, and the youth on the right side is the Esquire from Chaucer's Canterbury Tales. The coat of arms is an amalgam of elements of the three constituent Metropolitan Boroughs arms. The chequered band represents the three boroughs together. The cross was a common feature of Southwark and Camberwell. The well in the centre of the shield is a 'canting' reference to Camberwell and the cinquefoils represent the Dulwich area of Camberwell, while the ship on the top left refers to the maritime history of Bermondsey and was part of the Rotherhithe insignia. The rose on the right is from the Southwark arms where it represented St Saviour's parish, i.e. the cathedral.

Twinning

Southwark is twinned with:

 Langenhangen, Germany
 Clichy, Hauts-de-Seine, France
 Cambridge, Massachusetts, US

Politics

Southwark London Borough Council

The borough currently has since 2010 a Labour Party-led council which has been the case in all but eight years since its formation. Previous control saw a four-year coalition of Liberal Democrats and Conservatives, during which as small minority members the latter held 2 of the 10 executive positions, including deputy leader.

Summary of council election results:

(*) Danny McCarthy (Cathedrals ward) defected from the Lib Dems to Labour after the 2006 election.  Ola Oyewunmi (Peckham ward) did the reverse over one month to January 2010.  Ade Lasaki (South Bermondsey ward) defected from the Lib Dems to Labour in March 2010.  Susan Elan Jones resigned as councillor for The Lane ward to stand for MP to Clwyd South in Wales in the impending 2010 round of coinciding elections.
(**) Labour's candidates won 33 seats in 1998, of whom two resigned the whip to sit as independents, leaving no overall party-political control.

Westminster Parliament

The borough is covered by three parliamentary constituencies. Two are currently represented by Labour MPs; Neil Coyle was suspended from Labour on 11 February 2022 and currently sits as an independent.
 Camberwell and Peckham – Harriet Harman
 Dulwich and West Norwood (shared with London Borough of Lambeth) – Helen Hayes
 Bermondsey and Old Southwark – Neil Coyle

Sport and leisure

The London Borough of Southwark has the following sport clubs:

 Non-League football club Dulwich Hamlet F.C. who play at Champion Hill.
 Non-League football clubs Fisher F.C. & Bermondsey Town F.C. play at St Paul's Sports Ground, Rotherhithe.
 Independent Football Academy, Ballers Academy who train and play at St Paul's Sports Ground and The Docklands Settlement in Rotherhithe & Harris Academy in Bermondsey.

Transport

Bridges and tunnels

 Blackfriars Bridge
 London Bridge
 London Millennium Bridge
 Southwark Bridge
 Tower Bridge
 Rotherhithe Tunnel
 Thames Tunnel now part of the Overground

"A" Roads

Roads leading to bridges across the Thames meet at St. George's Circus
The A201 Inner Ring Road crosses the north-west of the area from the Elephant and Castle to Tower Bridge and the City.
The A2 runs along Old Kent Road through the north of the borough and is London's main artery from the centre out to Kent.
The A202 runs along Peckham High Street and passes the town hall.
The A205 London's South Circular Road runs east–west along Dulwich Common and Thurlow Park Road in the south.
The boundary with Bromley at Crystal Palace Parade is part of the A212.

London Underground (Tube) stations
The Bakerloo, Jubilee and Northern lines all run through the borough, below are the stations called at:
 Bermondsey (Jubilee line)
 Borough (Northern line (Bank Branch)
 Canada Water (Jubilee line)
 Elephant & Castle (Bakerloo and Northern line (Bank Branch)
 Kennington (Northern line)
 London Bridge (Jubilee and Northern line (Bank Branch)
 Southwark (Jubilee line)

London Overground stations
 Surrey Quays
 Rotherhithe
 Canada Water (also part of London Underground)
 Denmark Hill
 Peckham Rye
 Queens Road Peckham

Railway stations

National Rail services in the Borough are operated by Southern, Southeastern and Thameslink.

 Gipsy Hill
 Denmark Hill (also part of London Overground)
 East Dulwich
 West Dulwich
 London Bridge
 North Dulwich
 Nunhead
 Peckham Rye (also part of London Overground)
 Queens Road Peckham (also part of London Overground)
 Sydenham Hill
 South Bermondsey
 Elephant & Castle

Riverbus piers
Operated by Thames Clippers
 Bankside Pier – for Tate Modern and the Globe Theatre
 London Bridge City Pier
 Nelson Dock Pier
 Greenland Pier

Parking and DVLA database ban
In 2012 it was revealed that the Southwark borough council has been permanently banned from accessing information from the Driver & Vehicle Licensing Agency. This information is normally made available to local authorities for purposes such as enforcing parking fines, but access can be withdrawn if they are found to be mis-using the service. The Big Brother Watch organisation, which obtained the information about the ban under a Freedom of Information request, claimed that "the public are right to be worried that their privacy is at risk across a range of government services."

Travel to work
In March 2011, the main forms of transport that residents used to travel to work were: bus, minibus or coach, 17.5% of all residents aged 16–74; underground, metro, light rail, tram, 8.5%; train, 8.5%; on foot, 8.2%; driving a car or van, 8.1%; bicycle, 4.9%; work mainly at or from home, 2.8%.

Places

Localities

Parks and open spaces

Southwark Park
Burgess Park, (including trees at New Church Road)
Dulwich Park
Belair
Long Meadow a.k.a. Belle Meadow
Peckham Rye Park
Russia Dock Woodland
Sydenham Hill Wood
Geraldine Mary Harmsworth Park, Lambeth Road, SE1. This park houses the Imperial War Museum although the Museum only owns the land directly in front of it, and the remainder is a public park.
Nunhead Cemetery
Newington Gardens ( Previously Horsemonger Jail Park. To locals Jail Park )

Notable residents (past and present)

In 2003, the London Borough of Southwark started a blue plaque scheme for the commemoration of notable residents notably including living people in the awards. The London Borough of Southwark awards Blue Plaques through popular vote following public nomination. Unlike the English Heritage scheme, the original building is not necessary for nomination.

Freedom of the Borough
The following people and military units have received the Freedom of the Borough of Southwark.

Individuals
 Lance Sergeant Johnson Beharry  COG: 12 May 2012.
 Sir Michael Caine : 12 May 2012.
 Rt Hon Dame Tessa Jowell : 12 May 2012.
 Rt Hon Harriet Harman : 12 May 2012.
 Rt Hon Sir Simon Hughes: 12 May 2012.

Military units
Source:
 256 (City of London) Field Hospital (Volunteers): 30 June 2013.
 The Royal Marines Reserve (City of London): 30 June 2013.
 D Company The London Regiment: 30 June 2013.
 2nd Battalion The Princess of Wales's Royal Regiment.

See also

 Southwark News (local newspaper)

References

External links
Southwark Council website
Historic Southwark

 
Southwark
Southwark
1965 establishments in the United Kingdom